This articles presents the performance of S.S. Virtus Lanciano 1924, an Italian association football club, during the 2012-2013 season. During this season, Virtus Lanciano hosted the first championship of Serie B in its history.

Serie B

League table

Matches

Copa Italia

Virtus Lanciano 1924 season
S.S. Virtus Lanciano 1924 seasons